Nothrholaspis is a genus of mites in the family Macrochelidae. There are about six described species in Nothrholaspis.

Species
These six species belong to the genus Nothrholaspis:
 Nothrholaspis anatolicus
 Nothrholaspis carinata Berlese, 1918
 Nothrholaspis planus Vitzthum, 1935
 Nothrholaspis saboorii
 Nothrholaspis scutivagus Özbek, 2017
 Nothrholaspis turcicus

References

Macrochelidae
Articles created by Qbugbot